Ogilby is a surname. Notable people with the surname include:

Anne Ogilby ( 1943 – 1974), Northern Irish murder victim; killed by the Ulster Defence Association in a punishment beating
David Ogilby (disambiguation)
John Ogilby (1600–1676), Scottish translator, impresario and cartographer
William Ogilby (1805–1873), Irish barrister and naturalist
James Douglas Ogilby (1853–1925), Australian zoologist, son of William Ogilby
Robert Ogilby (1880–1964), soldier

See also
Ogilby, California, small town in the United States